Mond is a surname. Notable people with the surname include:

Alfred Mond, 1st Baron Melchett (1868-1930), British industrialist
Bernard Mond (1887-1957), Polish general
Chava Mond (born 1984), Israeli model
Emile Mond (1865-1938), German businessman
Frida Mond (1847-1923), German arts patron
Henry Mond, 2nd Baron Melchett (1898-1949), British politician
Jang Mond (born 1952), former Luxembourger professional footballer 
Josh Mond (born c. 1983),  American film director and producer
Julian Edward Alfred Mond, 3rd Baron Melchett (1925-1973), English industrialist
Julie Mond, American actress
Kellen Mond (born 1999), American football player 
Ludwig Mond (1839-1909), German chemist
Peter Mond, 4th Baron Melchett (born 1948-2018), British politician
Philip Mond, film director and cinematographer
Robert Mond (1867-1938), British chemist and archaeologist
Robert Mond (footballer) (1927-1985), Luxembourger professional footballer 
Steven Mond (born 1971), Canadian former child actor
Violet Mond, Baroness Melchett (1867-1945), English humanitarian